Ogmore is a constituency of the Senedd. It elects one Member of the Senedd by the first past the post method of election. It is one of seven constituencies in the South Wales West electoral region, which also elects four additional members, to produce a degree of proportional representation for the region as a whole.

Boundaries 

The constituency was created for the first election to the Assembly, in 1999, with the name and boundaries of the Ogmore Westminster constituency. It is almost entirely within the preserved county of Mid Glamorgan, but takes in a very small area in South Glamorgan. It covers the area of Bridgend County Borough Council roughly north of the M4, and parts of Rhondda Cynon Taf County Borough Council. It includes the communities of Cefn Cribwr, Garw Valley, Gilfach Goch, Llanharan, Maesteg, Ogwr Valley, Pencoed, Sarn and Tondu.

The other six constituencies of the region are Aberavon, Bridgend, Gower, Neath, Swansea East and Swansea West.

Voting 
In general elections for the Senedd, each voter has two votes. The first vote may be used to vote for a candidate to become the Member of the Senedd for the voter's constituency, elected by the first past the post system. The second vote may be used to vote for a regional closed party list of candidates. Additional member seats are allocated from the lists by the d'Hondt method, with constituency results being taken into account in the allocation.

Assembly members and Members of the Senedd

Elections

Elections in the 2020s

Regional Ballot void votes: 154. Want of an Official Mark (0), Voting for more than ONE party or individual candidate (58), Writing or mark by which the Voter could be identified (0), Unmarked or Void for uncertainty (96)

Elections in the 2010s 

Regional ballots rejected: 145

Elections in the 2000s 

2003 Electorate: 49,565
List ballots rejected: 303

Elections in the 1990s

Notes

References 

Senedd constituencies in the South Wales West electoral region
1999 establishments in Wales
Constituencies established in 1999
Politics of Bridgend County Borough